Investment arbitration is arbitration in investment disputes between foreign investors and the host state which finds place within the framework of either a bilateral investment treaty (BIT) between the host state and the investor's state or a multilateral treaty, such as the NAFTA or the Energy Charter Treaty.

Arbitration